Sally Brown is a fictional character in the comic strip Peanuts by Charles Schulz. She is the younger sister of main character Charlie Brown. She was first mentioned in May 1959 and throughout a long series of strips before her first appearance in August 1959. Cathy Steinberg was the first to voice Sally in 1965 for the CBS special A Charlie Brown Christmas; she was six years old at the time.

History
Sally was born on May 26, 1959, with Charlie Brown receiving a telephone call from the hospital and dashing out of the house yelling that he had a new baby sister. She was given the name "Sally" on June 2, 1959. Although Sally was often talked about and was the cause for a celebration that included Charlie Brown passing out chocolate cigars, it was not until August 23, 1959 that she finally made her first appearance in the strip.

Like other characters, such as Linus and Schroeder (who were also introduced to the strip as babies), Sally grew up quickly. The week of August 22, 1960, she took her first steps, and developed a lasting crush on Linus.

Sally went to kindergarten for the first time in a three-week sequence from August 20 to September 7, 1962. 

It was originally Linus who expressed a possible romantic interest in Sally. In a strip appearing shortly after Sally's birth, Linus is seen scribbling calculations on a fence. When Charlie Brown wanders by, Linus asks him, "When I'm 22 and Sally is 17, do you think she'll go out with me?"

In a storyline which began on November 29, 1965, Sally was diagnosed with amblyopia ex anopisa (lazy eye) which required her to wear an eye patch for a while. 

In September 1974, Sally started talking to her school building, expressing her fears and concerns about going to school. The building would answer back in thought bubbles, although Schulz's intention was that Sally couldn't hear these replies.

Portrayals
Cathy Steinberg was the first to voice Sally Brown in A Charlie Brown Christmas in 1965. Various actresses have voiced her since. Linda Jenner voiced her from It's a Mystery, Charlie Brown (1974) to Be My Valentine, Charlie Brown (1975). In It's Flashbeagle, Charlie Brown (1984), Snoopy's Getting Married, Charlie Brown (1985), and the 1983 season of The Charlie Brown and Snoopy Show, Sally was voiced by Stacy Ferguson, better known as Fergie of the Black Eyed Peas.

Other voice actresses who have played Sally include:

 Hilary Momberger (1969–1973)
 Erin Sullivan (1969)
 Lynn Mortensen (1974–1975)
 Gail Davis (1975–1977)
 Annalisa Bortolin (1980)
 Cindi Reilly (1981–1983)
 Stacy Heather Tolkin (1983)
 Tiffany Reinbolt (1985)
 Elizabeth Lyn Fraser (1986)
 Ami Foster (1988)
 Christina Lange (1988)
 Brittany Thornton (1988–1989)
 Adrienne Stiefel (1990)
 Kaitlyn Walker (1991)
 Mindy Ann Martin (1992)
 Jamie Hendy (1994)
 Danielle Keaton (1997)
 Nicolette Little (2002)
 Megan Taylor Harvey (2002–2003)
 Hanna Leigh Dworkin (2003)
 Sierra Marcoux (2006)
 Claire Corlett (2008)
 Amanda Pace (2011)
 Mariel Sheets (2015)
 Emma Yarovinsky (2016)
 Taylor Autumn Bertman (2016)
 Sara J. Gosselin (2018–2019)
 Hattie Kragten (2019-present)

Kristin Chenoweth played Sally in the Broadway revival of the musical You're a Good Man, Charlie Brown, winning the Tony Award for Best Featured Actress. The character of Sally had not been in the original production of You're a Good Man, Charlie Brown. In the revival Sally replaced Patty (not to be confused with the later character Peppermint Patty) who had long since disappeared from the comic strip. Sally was most recently played by Milly Shapiro in the 2016 revival of You're a Good Man Charlie Brown.

References

External links

Sally at Peanuts.com
The first appearance of Sally Brown in the Peanuts comic strip from August 23, 1959.

Comics characters introduced in 1959
Peanuts characters
Child characters in animated films
Child characters in comics
Child characters in musical theatre
Child characters in television
Female characters in animation
Female characters in comics